Simpson is an unincorporated community in Union Township, Huntington County, Indiana.

History
Simpson was platted in 1885. A post office was established at Simpson in 1886, and remained in operation until it was discontinued in 1902.

References

Unincorporated communities in Huntington County, Indiana
Unincorporated communities in Indiana